Sol Invictus ("Unconquered Sun"), sometimes simply known as Helios, was long considered to be the official sun god of the later Roman Empire. In recent years, however, the scholarly community has become divided on Sol between traditionalists and a growing group of revisionists.

In the traditional view, Sol Invictus was the second of two entirely different sun gods in Rome. The first of these, Sol Indiges, or Sol, was an early Roman deity of minor importance whose cult had petered out by the first century AD. Sol Invictus, on the other hand, was a Syrian sun god whose cult was first promoted in Rome under Elagabalus, without success. Some fifty years later, on 25 December AD 274, the Roman emperor Aurelian established the cult of Sol Invictus as an official religion, alongside the traditional Roman cults.

Although the Syrian origin of Sol Invictus is undisputed in the traditional view, there has never been consensus on which Syrian solar deity he was: Some scholars opt for the sky god of Emesa, Elagabalus, while others prefer Malakbel of Palmyra. There was general agreement that, from Aurelian to Constantine I, Sol was of supreme importance, until Constantine abandoned Sol in favor of Christianity. The last inscription referring to Sol Invictus dates to AD 387, and there were enough devotees in the fifth century that the Christian theologian Augustine found it necessary to preach against them.

In the revisionist view, there was only one cult of the Sun God in Rome, continuous from the monarchy to the end of antiquity. This was a Roman god who was simply called Sol. There were at least three temples of the Sun god in Rome, all active during the Empire and all dating from the earlier Republic. They claim that there was never a separate solar deity named Sol Invictus.

Invictus as epithet

Invictus ("unconquered, invincible") was an epithet utilized for several Roman deities, including Jupiter, Mars, Hercules, Apollo, and Silvanus. It had been in use from the 3rd century BC. The Roman cult to Sol is continuous from the "earliest history" of the city until the institution of Christianity as the exclusive state religion. Scholars have sometimes regarded the traditional Sol Indiges and Sol Invictus as two separate deities, but the rejection of this view by S. E. Hijmans has found supporters.

An inscription of AD 102 records a restoration of a portico of Sol in what is now the Trastevere area of Rome by a certain Gaius Iulius Anicetus. While he may have had in mind an allusion to his own cognomen, which is the Latinized form of the Greek equivalent of invictus, ἀνίκητος (anikētos), the earliest extant dated inscription that uses invictus as an epithet of Sol is from AD 158. Another, stylistically dated to the 2nd century, is inscribed on a Roman phalera (ornamental disk):  ("I glorify the unconquerable sun, the creator of light.") Augustus is a regular epithet linking deities to the Imperial cult.
Sol Invictus played a prominent role in the Mithraic mysteries, and was equated with Mithras. The relation of the Mithraic Sol Invictus to the public cult of the deity with the same name is unclear and perhaps non-existent.

Elagabalus 
According to the Historia Augusta, Elagabalus, the teenaged Severan heir, adopted the name of his deity and brought his cult image from Emesa to Rome. Once installed as emperor, he neglected Rome's traditional State deities and promoted his own as Rome's most powerful deity. This ended with his murder in 222. The Historia Augusta equates the deity Elagabalus with Jupiter and Sol: fuit autem Heliogabali vel Iovis vel Solis sacerdos, "He was also a priest of Heliogabalus, or Jove, or Sol". While this has been seen as an attempt to import the Syrian sun god to Rome, the Roman cult of Sol had existed in Rome at least since the early Republic.

Aurelian 

The Roman gens Aurelia was associated with the cult of Sol. After his victories in the East, the Emperor Aurelian thoroughly reformed the Roman cult of Sol, elevating the sun-god to one of the premier divinities of the Empire. Where previously priests of Sol had been simply sacerdotes and tended to belong to lower ranks of Roman society, they were now pontifices and members of the new college of pontifices instituted by Aurelian. Every pontifex of Sol was a member of the senatorial elite, indicating that the priesthood of Sol was now highly prestigious. Almost all these senators held other priesthoods as well, however, and some of these other priesthoods take precedence in the inscriptions in which they are listed, suggesting that they were considered more prestigious than the priesthood of Sol. Aurelian also built a new temple for Sol, which was dedicated on 25 December 274, and brought the total number of temples for the god in Rome to (at least) four. He also instituted games in honor of the sun god, held every four years from 274 onwards.

The identity of Aurelian's Sol Invictus has long been a subject of scholarly debate. Based on the Augustan History, some scholars have argued that it was based on Sol Elagablus (or Elagabla) of Emesa. Others, basing their argument on Zosimus, suggest that it was based on the Šams, the solar god of Palmyra on the grounds that Aurelian placed and consecrated a cult statue of the sun god looted from Palmyra in the temple of Sol Invictus. Forsythe (2012) discusses these arguments and adds a third more recent one, based on the work of Steven Hijmans. Hijmans argues that Aurelian's solar deity was simply the traditional Greco-Roman .

Constantine 

Emperors portrayed  on their official coinage, with a wide range of legends, only a few of which incorporated the epithet , such as the legend , claiming the "Unconquered Sun" as a companion to the Emperor, used with particular frequency by Constantine. Statuettes of Sol Invictus, carried by the standard-bearers, appear in three places in reliefs on the Arch of Constantine. Constantine's official coinage continues to bear images of Sol until 325/326. A solidus of Constantine as well as a gold medallion from his reign depict the Emperor's bust in profile twinned (jugate) with Sol Invictus, with the legend 

Constantine decreed (March 7, 321) the day of the Sun, "Sunday"as the Roman day of rest

Constantine's triumphal arch was carefully positioned to align with the colossal statue of Sol by the Colosseum, so that Sol formed the dominant backdrop when seen from the direction of the main approach towards the arch.

Sol and later Roman Emperors 
Berrens (2004) deals with coin-evidence of Imperial connection to the Solar cult. Sol is depicted sporadically on imperial coins in the 1st and 2nd centuries AD, then more frequently from Septimius Severus onwards until AD 325–326.  appears on coin legends from AD 261, well before the reign of Aurelian.

Connections between the imperial radiate crown and the cult of Sol are postulated. Augustus was posthumously depicted with radiate crown, as were living emperors from Nero (after AD 65) to Constantine. Some modern scholarship interprets the imperial radiate crown as a divine, solar association rather than an overt symbol of Sol; Bergmann calls it a pseudo-object designed to disguise the divine and solar connotations that would otherwise be politically controversial but there is broad agreement that coin-images showing the imperial radiate crown are stylistically distinct from those of the solar crown of rays; the imperial radiate crown is depicted as a real object rather than as symbolic light.

Hijmans argues that the Imperial radiate crown represents the honorary wreath awarded to Augustus, perhaps posthumously, to commemorate his victory at the Battle of Actium; he points out that henceforth, living emperors were depicted with radiate crowns, but state divi were not. Hijmans believes this implies that the radiate crown of living emperors is a symbolic link to Augustus. His successors automatically inherited (or sometimes acquired) the same offices and honours due to Octavian as "saviour of the Republic" through his victory at Actium, piously attributed to Apollo-Helios.

Furthermore, radiate crowns were not solely worn by emperors: The wreaths awarded to victors at the Actian Games were radiate.

Festival of Dies Natalis Solis Invicti

There is limited evidence that this festival was celebrated before the mid-4th century. The same Philocalian calendar, part VIII, also mentions the birth of Jesus Christ, stating that the "Lord Jesus Christ was born eight days before the calends of January" (that is, on December 25).

Legacy

Christianity 
According to some historians, Christmas was set to December 25th because it was the date of the festival of Sol Invictus. This idea became popular especially in the 18th and 19th centuries. 

The charioteer in the mosaic of Mausoleum M has been interpreted by some as Christ. Clement of Alexandria had spoken of Christ driving his chariot across the sky. This interpretation is doubted by others: "Only the cross-shaped nimbus makes the Christian significance apparent", and the figure is seen by some simply as a representation of the Sun with no explicit religious reference whatever, pagan or Christian.

Judaism

The traditional image of the Sun has also been used in early Jewish prophecy, poetry, and art. Psalm 19, begins "The heavens proclaim the glory of God, the firmament proclaims his handiwork", and likens the Sun to a bridegroom, to a warrior, and to the Torah.

An Aggadic legend found in tractate Avodah Zarah 8a contains the talmudic hypothesis that Adam the first established the tradition of fasting before the winter solstice, and rejoicing afterward, which festival later devolved into the Roman Saturnalia and Calenda.

A mosaic floor in Hamat Tiberias presents David as Helios surrounded by a ring with the signs of the zodiac. As well as in Hamat Tiberias, figures of Helios or Sol Invictus also appear in several of the very few surviving schemes of decoration surviving from Late Antique synagogues, including Beth Alpha, Husefa, all now in Israel, and Naaran in the West Bank. He is shown in floor mosaics, with the usual radiate halo, and sometimes in a quadriga, in the central roundel of a circular representation of the zodiac or the seasons. These combinations "may have represented to an agricultural Jewish community the perpetuation of the annual cycle of the universe or ... the central part of a calendar".

See also 
 Astrological age
 Christ myth theory
 Christian views on astrology
 Christianity and paganism
 Esoteric Christianity
 Saturnalia

Footnotes

References

External links 

 
 

 

274 establishments
270s establishments in the Roman Empire
 
Christmas
Christ myth theory
Elagabalus
Roman gods
Solar gods
Winter festivals
December observances
Christianity-related controversies
Deities of classical antiquity
Latin words and phrases
Christianity and Hellenistic religion